Josephine Elder was the pen name of Olive Gwendoline Potter (5 December 1895 – 24 July 1988), an English writer of children's literature who published ten school stories between 1924 and 1940 as well as numerous short stories for annuals. She is widely regarded as one of the best writers of the girls' school story. Her most acclaimed book is the 1929 title, Evelyn Finds Herself. Twenty years later Clare Mallory, another leading exponent of the girls' school story, dedicated one of her own books, Juliet Overseas to Josephine Elder, describing her as "Author of the best girls' school story I know: Evelyn Finds Herself."

In addition to her children's books Josephine Elder also wrote six novels for adults. Throughout her writing career she continued to practise as a doctor.

Biography 
Born in Croydon, Elder was educated at Croydon High School and later at Girton College, Cambridge University where she studied Natural Sciences. She practised as a G.P. in Sutton, Surrey from 1923 to 1983.

Bibliography

School stories
Erica Wins Through (Chambers, 1924)
The Scholarship Girl (Chambers, 1925)
The Scholarship Girl at Cambridge (Chambers, 1926)
Thomasina Toddy (Chambers, 1927)
Evelyn Finds Herself (OUP, 1929)
Barbara at School (Blackie, 1930)
The Redheads (OUP, 1931)

Farm school series
Exile for Annis (Collins, 1938)
Cherry Tree Perch (Collins, 1939)
Strangers at the Farm School (Collins, 1940)

As editor
School Stories for Girls (Hutchinson, 1935)

Adult novels

as Margaret Potter
Sister Anne Resigns (Selwyn & Blount, 1931)
The Mystery of the Purple Bentley (Selwyn & Blount, 1932)

as Josephine Elder
Lady of Letters (Lutterworth, 1949)
The Encircled Heart (Lutterworth, 1951)
The Doctor's Children (Lutterworth, 1954)
Fantastic Honeymoon (Robert Hale, 1961)

Recent reprints
Evelyn Finds Herself (Girls Gone By Publishers, 2006)
Lady of Letters (Greyladies, 2008)
The Encircled Heart (Greyladies, 2009)
Erica Wins Through (Girls Gone By Publishers, 2010)

References

Further reading
Sue Sims and Hilary Clare, The Encyclopaedia of Girls' School Stories, Ashgate, 2000

See also 
 

1895 births
1988 deaths
20th-century English novelists
20th-century English women writers
English children's writers
English women novelists
People educated at Croydon High School